The Super Mario Bros. Movie is an upcoming computer-animated fantasy film based on the Nintendo video game franchise Mario. Produced by Illumination with financing from Universal Pictures and Nintendo, and distributed by Universal, it is directed by Aaron Horvath and Michael Jelenic (in the latter's feature directorial debut) from a screenplay by Matthew Fogel. The ensemble voice cast includes Chris Pratt, Anya Taylor-Joy, Charlie Day, Jack Black, Keegan-Michael Key, Seth Rogen, Fred Armisen, Sebastian Maniscalco, Charles Martinet, and Kevin Michael Richardson. 

After the critical and commercial failure of the 1993 live-action Mario film, Nintendo became reluctant to license its intellectual properties for film adaptations. Mario creator Shigeru Miyamoto became interested in developing another film when Nintendo was bringing its older games to the Virtual Console service, and through Nintendo's work with Universal Parks & Resorts to create Super Nintendo World, he met Illumination founder Chris Meledandri. By 2016, the two were discussing a Mario film and, in January 2018, Nintendo announced that it would collaborate with Illumination and Universal to produce it. Production was underway by 2020, and the cast was publicly announced in September 2021.

The Super Mario Bros. Movie is scheduled for release in the United States on April 5, 2023, and in Japan on April 28.

Voice cast

 Chris Pratt as Mario: An Italian plumber.
 Anya Taylor-Joy as Princess Peach: The ruler of the Mushroom Kingdom and Mario’s love interest.
 Charlie Day as Luigi: Mario's timid fraternal twin brother.
 Jack Black as Bowser: The king of the Koopas, and the main antagonist of the film.
 Keegan-Michael Key as Toad: Peach's servant.
 Seth Rogen as Donkey Kong: An anthropomorphic tie-wearing gorilla, and the ruler of his own island.
 Fred Armisen as Cranky Kong: Donkey Kong's grandfather.
 Sebastian Maniscalco as Foreman Spike: The supervisor of the Wrecking Crew. He was Mario and Luigi’s former boss before they went on to start their own plumbing business.
 Charles Martinet, who voices Mario and Luigi in the Mario games, makes cameo appearances throughout the film.
 Kevin Michael Richardson as Kamek: A wizard and Bowser's servant and advisor.

Additionally, Khary Payton voices the Penguin King, and Eric Bauza is slated to appear in a yet-undisclosed role.

Production

Development

After the critical and commercial failure of the 1993 Super Mario Bros. film adaptation, Japanese video game company Nintendo became wary of licensing its properties for film adaptations. According to Mario creator Shigeru Miyamoto, the idea for a new Mario film came from bringing their older games to the Virtual Console and other services; such transitions took time for the company, and Miyamoto recognized that "our content business would be able to develop even further if we were able to combine our long-beloved software with that of video assets, and utilize them together for extended periods." Miyamoto knew that the process of making a film was far different from that of making a video game, and wanted a film expert to lead the effort.

Following the November 2014 hack of Sony Pictures, emails between producer Avi Arad, studio chief Amy Pascal, TriStar Pictures head Tom Rothman, and Sony Pictures Animation president of production Michelle Raimo Kouyate were released, revealing that Sony had been attempting to secure the film rights to the Mario franchise for several years. Arad visited Nintendo in Tokyo in February and July 2014 in an attempt to secure a deal. In October, Arad emailed Pascal and said he had closed the deal with Nintendo. Pascal suggested recruiting Sony Pictures Animation's Hotel Transylvania director Genndy Tartakovsky to help develop the project, while Kouyate said she could "think of 3–4 movies right out of the gate" and expressed hope in "build[ing] a Mario empire." However, after the emails leaked, Arad denied that a deal had been made, stating that negotiations had only begun. BuzzFeed News noted that the emails did not take into account potential conflicts with Sony Pictures' corporate sibling Sony Interactive Entertainment, one of Nintendo's chief competitors.
 
Through Nintendo's work with Universal Parks & Resorts to create Mario-based attractions, later resulting in Super Nintendo World, Miyamoto met Chris Meledandri, founder of Universal Pictures' Illumination animation division. Miyamoto found Meledandri's creative process similar to his own and felt he would be the proper lead for a Mario film. They had started more earnest discussions by 2016, knowing that if they felt it would not work that they could easily walk away. In November 2017, reports emerged that Nintendo was collaborating with Universal and Illumination to make an animated Mario film. Then-Nintendo president Tatsumi Kimishima clarified that a deal had not been finalized, but that an announcement would come soon. Kimishima hoped that if the deal were successful, a 2020 release date would be possible.

In January 2018, Nintendo announced that the film would progress with Miyamoto and Meledandri co-producing. Meledandri said the film was a "priority" for Illumination and that it will most likely come out in 2022. He added that Miyamoto would be "front and center" during production. In January 2020, Nintendo president Shuntaro Furukawa stated that the film was "moving along smoothly" with an expected 2022 release date. Furukawa also said Nintendo would own the rights to the film, and both Nintendo and Universal would fund the production.
 
In August 2021, it emerged that Teen Titans Go! creators Aaron Horvath and Michael Jelenic were directing the film after the discovery of an Illumination animator's LinkedIn profile that included the film in their list. Following the full casting announcement, Horvath and Jelenic were confirmed to be directing, with Matthew Fogel attached as the screenwriter after previously scribing Illumination's Minions: The Rise of Gru (2022). According to Khary Payton, who has collaborated with Horvath and Jelenic on various projects at Warner Bros. Animation, the duo flew to Illumination Studios Paris a month after the release of their first feature film, Teen Titans Go! To the Movies, in September 2018.

In September 2022, it was announced by New York Comic Con that the film's teaser trailer would be released on October 6, 2022; the teaser formally revealed the film's title, The Super Mario Bros. Movie. Shortly thereafter, Ed Skudder, who previously worked with Horvath on Unikitty!, confirmed that he worked as head of story on the film.

Writing 
For their work on the film, Jelenic and Horvath wanted their work to be the opposite of the "irreverent" Teen Titans Go!, aiming to develop a faithful adaptation of the games, which they both felt had not been done before, as well as something "more cinematic" and "more emotional" than Teen Titans Go!. Jelenic and Horvath wanted the film to serve as an "origin story" for Mario and Luigi, whom they wanted to portray as "blue-collar guys" by focusing on their backgrounds as Italian-American plumbers from Brooklyn. They also wanted to reflect how gamers win in the games by not giving up, turning that into a character trait for the film's portrayal of Mario.

While writing the film, Jelenic and Horvath chose to interchange Princess Peach and Luigi's roles from the games, with Luigi being the one in need of rescuing and Peach being the one helping Mario, because they felt having them in their original roles was "too straightforward". The duo drew inspiration from Super Mario 3D World (2013), a favorite of Jelenic's, and its portrayal of Peach as a playable character, with the duo wanting to focus on her role as the Mushroom Kingdom's monarch and "how strong that person would need to be to protect [the Toads]". They also rewrote Bowser into a scarier character, while also adding some comedy and vulnerability to the character.

Casting

In February 2021, Mario voice actor Charles Martinet said the possibility of reprising his role in the film would be a "marvelous thing" and that if he were asked to voice Mario, "I'll go in and play with great joy and happiness." In August 2021, Sebastian Maniscalco revealed he was voicing Spike, Mario and Luigi's boss from the game Wrecking Crew (1985).

During a September 2021 Nintendo Direct presentation, Shigeru Miyamoto announced that Chris Pratt, Anya Taylor-Joy, Charlie Day, Jack Black, Keegan-Michael Key, Seth Rogen, Kevin Michael Richardson, Fred Armisen, and Maniscalco would headline the voice cast and that Martinet would be featured in "surprise cameos". The announcement was met with a mixed reaction from fans; while some welcomed the idea of celebrity actors voicing the characters, others questioned and criticized the choices, in particular Pratt as Mario instead of Martinet (who has voiced the character since 1992) or an Italian actor. Meledandri said Pratt would not be voicing Mario with a thick Italian accent as Martinet has traditionally done; voice actor Khary Payton described Pratt's voice a "cousin to the Sopranos". Voice actress Tara Strong criticized Pratt's casting and expressed a preference for Martinet to voice Mario instead, lamenting on Twitter what she described to be Hollywood's disregard of professional voice actors. In response to the criticism of Pratt's casting, Horvath stated, "For us, it made total sense. He's really good at playing a blue-collar hero with a ton of heart. For the way that Mario is characterized in our film, he's perfect for it."

Plot details were kept secret from the actors during recording, according to Day, who noted he had to record his dialogue in many different ways, after which the directors selected the version they believed would be best suited for the scene. Upon the trailer's release, voice actors Khary Payton and Eric Bauza confirmed their parts in the film; Payton voices the Penguin King and Bauza is slated to appear in a yet-undisclosed role. During the COVID-19 pandemic, Payton recorded his lines in a closet at his home, though he was uncertain if he would appear in the final edit.

Animation and design
The film was animated by Illumination Studios Paris in Paris, France. Production was underway by September 2020, with animation work ending in October 2022. Lighting animation and rendering were improved from previous Illumination projects for the film. Donkey Kong's design was changed for the first time since the video game Donkey Kong Country (1994). For his new design, artists incorporated elements of both his modern design and his original design from his debut appearance in Donkey Kong (1981). Jelenic and Horvath wanted the animation to balance between cartoony and realistic styles, flipping between moments of slapstick comedy and genuinely peril-filled action sequences. For the go-karts featured in the film, the directors worked with a vehicle design artist and artists at Nintendo to create go-karts that fit their portrayal in the film while drawing inspiration from their portrayal in the Mario Kart games. Post-production work on the film ended by March 2023.

Music
During an October 2022 Nintendo Direct presentation, Meledandri confirmed that Brian Tyler is set to compose the score for the film. Tyler is working closely with longtime Mario composer Koji Kondo to incorporate themes from the games within the film's score. Recording sessions for the score began on October 17, 2022, at the Eastwood Scoring Stage at Warner Bros. Songs from Jack Black and Keegan-Michael Key were improvised for the film.

Black Hydra composed the music for its official trailer, called "Super Mushroom". The instrumental was released on November 30, 2022, on YouTube.

Marketing
On October 6, the teaser trailer was released live in a Nintendo Direct presentation, showing Bowser and his army attacking a kingdom of Penguins and finding a Power Star, Mario first arriving to the Mushroom Kingdom and Luigi running from an army of Dry Bones. In a short questions and answers period following the trailer reveal at New York Comic Con, Jack Black stated that "Bowser has a musical side" in the film, teasing a theme for the character. The teaser trailer received over three million views in 24 hours. Journalists generally praised the trailer's visuals and tone, as well as Black and Key's respective performances as Bowser and Toad. However, Pratt's performance as Mario was described as lacking in emotion and sounding too similar to his normal speaking voice. Vic Hood from TechRadar noted a slight New York accent in Mario's lines, calling it a possible throwback to Mario's depictions in American media such as The Super Mario Bros. Super Show! and the 1993 film, before Charles Martinet debuted as the character's official voice actor in Mario's Game Gallery where he spoke full dialogue for extended periods of time. In a newsletter from The Guardian, the response to Pratt's voice was likened to the backlash against the first trailer of Sonic the Hedgehog.

On November 29, the official trailer was shown in a Nintendo Direct with footage showing Mario losing a fight against Donkey Kong in an arena filled with other Kongs, Bowser interacting with a captured Luigi; Mario training on an obstacle course resembling a typical Super Mario game level; power-ups such as the Tanooki Suit and the Fire Flower; and several characters driving go-karts on a path reminiscent of the Rainbow Road, a recurring location in the Mario Kart series. Public reactions were still largely favorable, though online discourse continued to center on Pratt's performance as Mario. 

On December 9, the first clip of the film, showing Toad guiding Mario through the Mushroom Kingdom and to the entrance to Peach’s Castle, was revealed at The Game Awards 2022. The Verge Ash Parrish commented, "Despite the skepticism surrounding Chris Pratt's performance as Mario, the movie's visuals — and I cannot stress enough, only the visuals — look incredible".

On January 29, 2023, a preview clip of the film was released during the NFC Championship Game between the San Francisco 49ers and Philadelphia Eagles. The footage revealed Rogen’s performance as Donkey Kong and included Mario's transformation into Cat Mario, first seen in Super Mario 3D World. Some entertainment news sites pointed out the addition of Rogen's "iconic laugh" heard as Donkey Kong. Emma Roth from The Verge commented, "I'm pleasantly surprised at how well his voice (and laugh) suits the character" while Luke Plunkett from Kotaku commented, "Seth Rogen has been hired to... just be Seth Rogen".

On February 12, 2023, a Super Bowl commercial for the film was released, featuring a rendition of the title theme from The Super Mario Bros. Super Show!. A corresponding website which was featured in the trailer was also released, which advertises the Super Mario Bros. plumbing service from the film as if it were, according to Plunkett, "...a struggling small business servicing the Brooklyn and Queens areas".

Release
The Super Mario Bros. Movie is scheduled to be theatrically released by Universal Pictures in the United States on April 5, 2023, followed by Japan on April 28, in both regular formats and in IMAX 2D and 3D. The film was previously scheduled to be released on December 21, 2022 and April 7, 2023 (the former of which was taken over by DreamWorks Animation's Puss in Boots: The Last Wish in response to the film's delay to the later date). On February 28, 2023, it was announced that the film would be released two days earlier, on its current date, to more than 60 markets while maintaining the April 28 date for Japan and stating that additional markets are to follow during April and May.

It will be available to stream on Peacock 45 days afterwards and on Netflix in late 2023.

Box office projections
The Super Mario Bros. Movie is projected to earn at least $85-90 million domestically on its opening week.

Future
In May 2021, Furukawa said that Nintendo was interested in producing more animated films based on its intellectual properties if the Mario film is successful. The following November, reports emerged that Illumination was developing a Donkey Kong spin-off film, with Rogen set to reprise his role. In February 2022, Day expressed interest in reprising his role as Luigi in a Luigi's Mansion film.

See also
List of films based on video games

Notes

References

External links

2020s adventure comedy films
2020s American animated films
2020s animated films
2020s buddy comedy films
2020s children's adventure films
2020s English-language films
2020s fantasy adventure films
2020s Japanese films
2023 comedy films
2023 computer-animated films
American action comedy films
American adventure comedy films
American children's adventure films
American children's animated comedy films
American children's animated fantasy films
American children's comedy films
American children's fantasy films
American computer-animated films
American fantasy adventure films
American fantasy comedy films
American science fantasy films
American science fiction comedy films
Animated buddy films
Animated films about apes
Animated films about brothers
Animated films about turtles
Animated films based on video games
Animated films set in Brooklyn
Casting controversies in film
English-language Japanese films
Films about parallel universes
Films about princesses
Films scored by Brian Tyler
Films set in a fictional country
Illumination (company) animated films
IMAX films
Japanese children's fantasy films
Japanese computer-animated films
Japanese fantasy adventure films
Mario (franchise) films
Universal Pictures animated films
Universal Pictures films
Upcoming directorial debut films
Upcoming films